Dylan Mitchell Donahue (born August 20, 1992) is an American football linebacker who is a free agent. He played college football at West Georgia. He was drafted by the New York Jets in the fifth round of the 2017 NFL Draft.

Professional career
Donahue played at The University of Montana-Western, Palomar College and West Georgia before he was drafted by the New York Jets in the fifth round, 181st overall, in the 2017 NFL Draft. On May 23, 2017, the Jets signed Donahue to four-year, $2.6 million contract. On October 1, 2017, during Week 4 against the Jacksonville Jaguars, Donahue injured his elbow after blocking a punt. He suffered torn ligaments in his elbow, which required surgery, ending his rookie season. In four games of his rookie year in 2017, Donahue finished with five tackles.

On September 1, 2018, Donahue was waived by the Jets.

In 2019, Donahue joined the Atlanta Legends of the Alliance of American Football. The league ceased operations in April 2019.

He signed with the Winnipeg Blue Bombers on January 20, 2020. He was released on March 12, 2021.

Personal life
On August 3, 2018, it was revealed that Donahue was arrested twice in two separate incidents due to DWI. Dating back to May 9, 2017, he was arrested in Billings Montana for drunk-driving. His blood alcohol content was 0.137, he was fined $1,000, and given a three-month suspended sentence. On the second incident, he was arrested in the Lincoln Tunnel between Weehawken, New Jersey and New York City. He drove the wrong way, crashed into a bus, and was charged for DUI.

References

External links
 West Georgia Wolves profile
 New York Jets profile

1992 births
Living people
American football linebackers
New York Jets players
Players of American football from Montana
Sportspeople from Billings, Montana
West Georgia Wolves football players
Atlanta Legends players
Winnipeg Blue Bombers players